Vincent Karl Newsome (born January 22, 1961) is a former American football safety. He currently works in the front office for the Baltimore Ravens as the Director of Pro Personnel, which is a position he has held since a 2009 promotion.

External links
 Baltimore Ravens bio

1961 births
Living people
American football safeties
American football cornerbacks
Washington Huskies football players
Los Angeles Rams players
Cleveland Browns players
Players of American football from Washington (state)
Ed Block Courage Award recipients